The Haves and the Have Nots can refer to:

 The Haves and the Have Nots (play)
 The Haves and the Have Nots (TV series)
 An expression (variously translated) used by Sancho Panza in Cervantes's Don Quixote (Part II, Ch. 20)